Pauli Antero Kiuru (born 8 December 1962 in Valkeakoski) is a Finnish triathlete, businessman and politician. He is a member of the Parliament of Finland since 2011, representing the National Coalition Party.

He has been on the podium of the Ironman World Championship race three times; He was third in years 1990 and 1992, and second in year 1993.

References

1962 births
Living people
People from Valkeakoski
National Coalition Party politicians
Members of the Parliament of Finland (2011–15)
Members of the Parliament of Finland (2015–19)
Members of the Parliament of Finland (2019–23)
Finnish male triathletes
University of Turku alumni